The 2022 Ceratizit Challenge by La Vuelta is a women's road cycling stage race that was held in Spain from 7 to 11 September 2022. It was the eight edition of the Ceratizit Challenge by La Vuelta and was the twenty-second event on the 2022 UCI Women's World Tour calendar.

Teams 
All fourteen UCI Women's WorldTeams and seven UCI Women's Continental Teams made up the twenty-two teams that participated in the race.  was the only team not to enter a full squad of six riders. In total, 131 riders started the race.

UCI Women's WorldTeams

 
 
 
 
 
 
 
 
 
 
 
 
 
 

UCI Women's Continental Teams

 
 
 
 
 
 Soltec Team

Route 
The 2022 edition increased the number of stages to 5, with the race finishing in Madrid.

Stages

Stage 1 
7 September 2022 — Marina de Cudeyo to Marina de Cudeyo,  (TTT)

Stage 2 
8 September 2022 — Colindres to Colindres,

Stage 3 
9 September 2022 — Camargo to Aguilar de Campoo,

Stage 4 
10 September 2022 — Palencia to Segovia,

Stage 5 
11 September 2022 — Madrid to Madrid,

Classification leadership table

Classification standings

General classification

Points classification

Mountains classification

Team classification

See also 
 2022 in women's road cycling

References

External links 
 

2022 UCI Women's World Tour
2022
2022 in Spanish sport
September 2022 sports events in Spain